Mikey Gow is an ambidextrous sophomore quarterback who plays for Bellevue East High School in Nebraska. He is a highly regarded high school sophomore football player. A May 2022 video of Gow throwing footballs accurately both right and left handed went viral (2 million views) on TikTok.

Early life
Gow claims that at age 9, an injury prevented him from using his right arm for almost a year. His mother suggested that he try throwing with his left arm. He developed the use of his left arm but he claims that his right arm is stronger and more fluid.

High School
Gow plays American football for Bellevue East High School in Nebraska. A video posted of Gow demonstrating his ability was posted to SportsCenter's Twitter page May 18, 2022 and it accumulated over 2 million views. The 30-second video which showed him throwing footballs accurately both hands became a Viral video.

After seeing the video NFL quarterback Lamar Jackson stated that Gow will be a “#1 Overall pick (NFL). Gow is currently being scouted by Notre Dame, Michigan, Oklahoma State and Texas.

Gow started as a freshman quarterback during the 2021 season and had a 2–7 record. He started his sophomore year at Bellevue East but on September 2, 2022, he broke his right wrist in a 42–0 loss to Norfolk. It was the second game of the 2022 season and it was determined that Gow would miss the rest of the season.

References

External links
Mikey Gow, Bellevue East, Quarterback - 247 Sports

High school football players in the United States
People from Bellevue, Nebraska
Year of birth missing (living people)
Living people